Kõrveküla is a small borough in Tartu Parish, Tartu County in eastern Estonia. As of 2011 Census, the settlement's population was 733. There is also commune administration.

Composer, choral conductor and organist Miina Härma (1864–1941), was born at Kõrveküla schoolhouse. Nowadays the building hosts a museum, dedicated to her life and career.

References

External links
Satellite map at Maplandia.com

Boroughs and small boroughs in Estonia
Tartu Parish
Kreis Dorpat